"Black Slacks" is a song written by Joe Bennett and Jimmy Denton and performed by Joe Bennett & the Sparkletones.  It reached #11 on the R&B chart and #17 on the Billboard pop chart in 1957.

The single ranked #100 on Billboard's Year-End Hot 100 singles of 1957.

The rockabilly band Jackslacks adopted their name from the song "Black Slacks".

Personnel
Joe Bennett - vocals, guitar
Wayne Arthur - double bass
Howard "Sparky" Childress - guitar
Jimmy "Sticks" Denton - drums

Other versions
Buchanan & Goodman sampled the song on their 1957 single, "Santa and the Satellite".
Robert Gordon released a version of the song as a single in 1979.
Matchbox released a version of the song as a single in the United Kingdom in 1979.
Simon & Garfunkel released a version of the song as a medley with their song "Hey, Schoolgirl" on their 1997 compilation album, Old Friends.

In media
The Sparkletones version has been featured in the films, Crazy Mama (1975) and The Rescuers Down Under (1990).

References

1957 songs
1957 singles
1979 singles
The Sparkletones songs
ABC Records singles
RCA Records singles
Magnet Records singles